Union Corner is an unincorporated community in Berkeley County, West Virginia, United States.

Redbud Hollow in Union Corner was listed on the National Register of Historic Places in 1980.

References

Unincorporated communities in Berkeley County, West Virginia
Unincorporated communities in West Virginia